St Kilda mouse may refer to:

 St Kilda field mouse
 St Kilda house mouse (extinct)

Animal common name disambiguation pages